"They're Coming to Take Me Away, Ha-Haaa!" is a 1966 novelty record written and performed by Jerry Samuels (billed as Napoleon XIV), and released on Warner Bros. Records. The song became an instant success in the United States, peaking at No. 3 on the Billboard Hot 100 popular music singles chart on August 13, No. 1 on the Cash Box Top 100 Pop Singles  charts, No. 2 in Canada, and No. 4 on the UK Singles Chart.

Lyrics 
The lyrics consist of a man seemingly addressing his ex-girlfriend, describing his descent into madness after her leaving him and his impending committal to a "funny farm" (slang for a psychiatric hospital). However, the final verse reveals that he is not addressing a woman, but instead a runaway dog: "They'll find you yet, and when they do, they'll put you in the ASPCA, you mangy mutt!" 

Samuels was concerned that the record would be viewed as a travesty of the mentally ill, and intentionally added the line so "you realize that the person is talking about a dog having left him, not a human".  Said Samuels, "I felt it would cause some people to say 'Well, it's alright.' And it did. It worked."

Song structure and technical background
The song is driven by a snare drum, bass drum, tambourine and hand clap rhythm. The vocal is spoken rhythmically rather than sung melodically, while the vocal pitch rises and falls at key points to create an unusual glissando effect, augmented by the sound of wailing sirens.

According to Samuels, the vocal pitch shift was achieved by manipulating the recording speed of his vocal track, a multitrack variation on the technique used by Ross Bagdasarian in creating the original Chipmunks novelty songs. At the time the song was written, Samuels was working as a recording engineer at Associated Recording Studios in New York. Samuels used a variable-frequency oscillator to alter the 60 Hz frequency of the hysteresis motor of a multitrack tape recording machine.  He first recorded the rhythm track, then overdubbed the vocal track while slowing the tape at the end of each chorus (and reciting the words in time with the slowing beat), so when it was played back at normal speed, the tempo would be steady but the pitch of his voice would rise. 
He came up the idea for a song inspired by the rhythm of the old Scottish tune "The Campbells Are Coming". Some tracks were treated with intermittent tape-based echo effects created by an Echoplex. Samuels also layered in siren effects that gradually rose and fell with the pitch of his vocals.

B-side 
Continuing the theme of insanity, the flip or B-side of the single was simply the A-side played in reverse, and given the title "!aaaH-aH ,yawA eM ekaT oT gnimoC er'yehT" (or "Ha-Haaa! Away, Me Take to Coming They're") and the performer billed as "XIV NAPOLEON". Most of the label affixed to the B-side was a mirror image of the front label (as opposed to simply being spelled backward), including the letters in the "WB" shield logo. Only the label name, disclaimer, and record and recording master numbers were kept frontward. The reverse version of the song is not included on the original Warner Bros. album, although the title is shown on the front cover, where the title is actually spelled backward.

In his Book of Rock Lists, rock music critic Dave Marsh calls the B-side the "most obnoxious song ever to appear in a jukebox", saying the recording once "cleared out a diner of forty patrons in two minutes flat."

Airplay 
The song charted at No. 3 on the Billboard Hot 100 charts on August 13, No. 1 on the Cash Box Top 100 charts on July 30, No. 2 in Canada, and No. 4 on the UK Singles Chart.

Warner Bros. Records reissued the original single (#7726) in 1973. It entered the Billboard Hot 100 at No. 87 but stalled at No. 101 at the Week Ahead charts which was an addition to the Cash Box Top 100 charts. The reissue featured the "Burbank/palm trees" label.  As with the original release, the labels for the reissue's B-side also included mirror-imaged print except for the disclaimer, record catalog, and track master numbers.  The "Burbank" motto at the top of the label was also kept frontward as well as the "WB" letters in the shield logo, which had been printed in reverse on the originals.

Chart history

Sequels
"I'm Happy They Took You Away, Ha-Haaa!" was recorded by CBS Radio Mystery Theater cast member Bryna Raeburn, credited as "Josephine XV", and was the closing track on side two of the 1966 Warner Bros. album.  (Josephine was the name of the spouse of the French Emperor Napoleon Bonaparte.)

In 1966, "They Took You Away, I'm Glad, I'm Glad" appeared on These Are the Hits, You Silly Savages by Teddy & Darrel.

A variation of "They're Coming to Take Me Away, Ha-Haaa!" was also done by Jerry Samuels, from that same album titled Where the Nuts hunt the Squirrels, where Samuels, towards the end of the track, repeats the line: "THEY'RE TRYING TO DRIVE ME SANE!!! HA HA," before the song's fade, in a fast-tracked higher voice.

In 1966, KRLA disc jockey "Emperor Bob" Hudson recorded a similarly styled song titled I'm Normal, including the lines "They came and took my brother away/The men in white picked him up yesterday/But they'll never come take me away, 'cos I'm O.K./I'm normal." Another line in the song was: "I eat my peas with a tuning fork." The record was credited simply to "The Emperor".

In 1988, Samuels wrote and recorded "They're Coming To Get Me Again, Ha Haaa!", a sequel to the original record. It was included on a single two years later on the Collectables label. It never charted, and was combined with the original 1966 recording on side A. (Both sequels are included on Samuels' 1996 Second Coming album.) In the song, the singer has been released from the mental hospital, although he is not completely cured of his insanity, and grows paranoid that he will be re-institutionalized. Toward the end of the song, he relapses into the "funny farm" and "happy home"—until when reality sinks in, he cries out at a fast tracked double voice with the words: "OH NO!!!" before the beat ends with a door slam, indicating that he has been locked up in the insane asylum.

The recording appeared on disk releases by Dr. Demento in 1975 as part of Dr. Demento's Delights, then in subsequent Dr. Demento LP records released in 1985, 1988 and 1991.

Cover versions 
Many cover versions of the song were recorded following the song's release in 1966. Kim Fowley released a cover of the song as his second single, after "The Trip".

References

1966 debut singles
1966 songs
Cashbox number-one singles
Novelty songs
Songs about dogs
Songs about mental health
Warner Records singles